William Wolstenholme (24 February 1865 in Blackburn, Lancashire23 July 1931 in London) was an English composer and organist.

Wolstenholme was the first blind musician to take the degree since John Stanley. He was a close friend of the other noted blind organist Alfred Hollins and was also well known as a recitalist. Wolstenholme's devoted sister Maud acted as his secretary and amanuensis for most of his life.

References
 Henderson, John. A Directory of Composers for Organ Third Revised and Enlarged Edition. John Henderson (Publishing) Ltd., 2005, p. 201.

External links
 

1865 births
1931 deaths
English composers
English organists
British male organists
Blind classical musicians
People from Blackburn
Musicians from Lancashire